Leif Selby (born 26 July 1972) is a retired Australian Lawn bowler.

Bowls career
He won the lawn bowls gold medal in the singles competition and silver in the pairs with Aron Sherriff at the 2012 World Outdoor Bowls Championship. He also won the silver medal in the singles competition at the 2010 Commonwealth Games.

He twice won the gold medal in 2009 and 2010 at the World Cup Singles in Warilla, New South Wales, Australia.

He won three gold medals and one silver medal at the Asia Pacific Bowls Championships and in 2009, he won the Hong Kong International Bowls Classic singles title.

Retirement
He made a shock announcement in 2012 that he was retiring despite being at the pinnacle of his sport. He had played 142 international games.

References

1972 births
Living people
Australian male bowls players
Bowls World Champions
Commonwealth Games medallists in lawn bowls
Commonwealth Games silver medallists for Australia
Bowls players at the 2010 Commonwealth Games
Medallists at the 2010 Commonwealth Games